Engineers India Limited (EIL) is an Indian public sector engineering consultancy and technology licensing company. It was set up in 1965 with the mandate of providing indigenous technology solutions across hydrocarbon projects. Over the years, it has also diversified into synergic sectors like non-ferrous metallurgy, infrastructure, water and wastewater management and fertilizers.

EIL is headquartered at Bhikaji Cama Place, New Delhi. EIL also has an R&D complex at Gurgaon, a branch office at Mumbai, regional offices at Kolkata, Chennai, Vadodara, inspection offices at all major equipment manufacturing locations in India and overseas offices in London (England), Milan (Italy), Shanghai (China), Abu Dhabi (UAE).

EIL has a wholly-owned subsidiary Certification Engineers International Limited (CEIL). It has set up a joint venture company namely Ramagundam Fertilizers and Chemicals Limited (RFCL)  for enhancing the presence in fertilizers sector.

As of March 2021, EIL has more than 2400 engineers & professionals in its employee base of over 2800 employees.

Navratna status was accorded by Government of India in 2014.

History

EIL was incorporated on March 15, 1965, as a private limited company under the name Engineers India Private Limited pursuant to a memorandum of agreement dated June 27, 1964 between the Government of India and Bechtel International Corporation. In May 1967, EIL became a wholly-owned Government of India (GoI) enterprise.

The following table illustrates the major events in the history of the company.

 1970 - Commenced first international assignment
 1972 - Commenced work in the metallurgy segment
 1978 - Commenced work in onshore oil and gas processing segment
 1989 - Set up its own Research and Development centre at Gurugram
 1994 - Subsidiary, Certification Engineers International Limited was set up
 1997 - Listing on the BSE and NSE; Mini Ratna status accorded by Government of India
 2006 - Commenced work in underground crude oil storages
 2010 - Further Public Offer of 10% of its paid-up equity share capital
 2011-16 - Overseas expansion in Fertilizer | Largest overseas order from Nigeria | 20% stake offloaded by GoI (FPO/OFS) in 2016

Businesses

The major business areas wherein EIL provides its engineering consultancy services are:

 Petroleum Refining
 Petrochemicals, Chemicals & Fertilizers
 Crude, Petroleum products & Gas Pipelines
 Onshore & Offshore Oil & Gas 
 Terminals & Storage
 Underground crude oil storages
 Mining & Metallurgy
 Infrastructure & Urban Development

EIL has also ventured into various unconventional energy resource projects like solar, 2G ethanol, bio-fuel etc.

Services

EIL provides a wide range of engineering consultancy and EPC services to its clients:

 Process Design
 Engineering
 Supply Chain Management
 Project Management
 Construction Management
 Specialized services like Heat & Mass Transfer, Plant Operation & Safety Management, Specialist Materials & Maintenance services, Environment Engineering

Track Record

EIL has executed over 7000 assignments including 500 major projects valued over US$200 Billion. EIL's project portfolio consists of:

  89 Refinery projects including 10 Greenfield Refineries
 12 mega Petrochemical complexes
 11 Fertilizer Plants
 44 Oil and Gas processing projects
 213 Offshore platforms including 40 process platforms  
 50 Pipeline projects  
 33 Mining & Metallurgy Projects
 14 Ports, storage & terminals projects
 Over 40 infrastructure projects including airports, highways, flyovers, bridges, water and sewer management, as well as energy-efficient intelligent buildings
 24 turnkey projects.

Research & Development

EIL is a technology driven organization which invests in Research and Technology in the Hydrocarbons and Renewable Energy Sectors.

The company's research and development center in Gurugram is undertaking technology development both in-house and in collaboration with other organizations like IOCL-R&D, BPCL-R&D, IIP, CHT, HPCL, CPCL, NRL etc.

EIL has developed more than 35 process technologies and the technology portfolio consists of various technologies for petroleum refining, oil and gas processing and aromatics. The Company holds 35 live patents and has 32 pending patent applications relating to various process technologies.

Corporate Social Responsibility 

EIL operates its business in a socially responsible way, by taking into consideration the wider interests of the community and the environment, with a vision of promoting sustainable development. Some of EIL's core CSR Focus areas are as follows:

 Education
 Health Care
 Drinking Water/Sanitation
 Rural Electrification
 Women Empowerment
 Upliftment of underprivileged
 Community Development
 Vocational Training/Skill Centres

References

External links
 Official website

Companies based in Delhi
Petroleum engineering
Institutions of Petroleum in India
Government-owned companies of India
Construction and civil engineering companies of India
Construction and civil engineering companies established in 1965
Indian companies established in 1965
1965 establishments in Delhi
Companies listed on the National Stock Exchange of India
Companies listed on the Bombay Stock Exchange